Garm Bit-e Pain (also Romanized as Garm Bīt-e Pāīn) is a village in Bahu Kalat Rural District, Dashtiari District, Chabahar County, Sistan and Baluchestan Province, Iran. At the 2006 census, its population was 532, in 108 families.

References 

Populated places in Chabahar County